Wall railway station served the village of Wall, Northumberland, England from 1858 to 1955 on the Border Counties Railway.

History 
The station opened on 5 April 1858 by the North British Railway. The signal box was on the platform and it opened in 1890. Opposite the platform were two loops, one handling goods traffic. In the 1940s an arson attack occurred and the station building was damaged. No repairs were ever made. A wooden structure was built shortly after to provide shelter for passengers. Due to low ticket sales, the station closed to both passengers and goods traffic on 19 September 1955. The platform, as well as the signal box, was still extant in 1974.

References

External links 

Disused railway stations in Northumberland
Former North British Railway stations
Railway stations in Great Britain opened in 1858
Railway stations in Great Britain closed in 1955
1858 establishments in England
1955 disestablishments in England
railway station